The Bad Good Man is a 1973 Soviet drama film based on the novella The Duel by Anton Chekhov.

Plot 
The plot takes place on one of Caucasus coast towns, possibly at the late 19th century and is circled around 2 Russian noblemen with 2 very contrast personalities and principles. Ivan Layevski (Oleg Dahl) - a possible philologist though his profession is not officially revealed - has arrived to the town with his love interest Nadyezhda Fyodorovna (Lyudmila Maksakova), who escaped with him from her husband in Saint Petersburg. Even though Layevski is aware of her husband recent death - he hides it from Nadyezhda Fyodorovna fearing from the consequences that will force him to marry her, because he is no longer in love with her in such way. Both have weak, unsecured, lazy and sometimes coward personality and prefer to live an easy going and "laid-back" lifestyle instead of working hard and achieve something by themselves. Nadyezhda spends all her time trying new clothes, enjoying the life by the sea and flirting with other men in town, while Layevski - by partying, drinking and teaching everybody to play cards. Such lifestyle is heavily despised by a zoologist Nikolai Von Koren (Vladimir Vysotsky). In contrast to  Layevski, Von Koren is very hard working, extremist and egotistical, believing people that don't work hard to achieve something worthy in their lives - need to be eliminated in any methods. In between - there is their mutual friend Alexander Samoylenko (Anatoli Papanov) - a good hearted local doctor who desperately tries to amid between them. After being once again criticized but Von Koren and others for their lifestyle and behavior over a picnic - Layevski put all the blame for this, and their failure to fulfill their dreams, on Nadyezhda Fyodorovna and publicly insults her. Later he informs her about her husband's death. Now, really fearing from the consequences - he decides to leave Nadyezhda Fyodorovna and, unknowingly to her, escape to Saint Petersburg. Not having enough money to take the ship back - he asks Samoylenko to borrow him. Samoylenko promises him to try and get it - since he also doesn't have the required sum. Nadyezhda Fyodorovna, meanwhile, is bullied by one of the local high rank and respected officer Kirilin who claims that her temporary flirts with him is a direct insult for his status and ego and forces her to go for a 2 sexual "dates" with him.   

After some time, since still not hearing from Samoylenko, a desperate Layevski unceremoniously demands from him to hurry up, forcing Samoylenko to ask around the locals, including Von Koren, since most of them owe him a lot of money anyway. Though eventually giving the money, Von Koren insults Layevski once they both are in Samoylenko's home disrespectfully reminding him about his desperate situation and informing him about the gossips the whole town (including Samoylenko) are sharing about him. Finally frustrated from such disrespect - Layevski blows up demanding to leave him alone and unintentionally threatens to fight if necessary. Von Koren finds it as a challenge for a duel and unceremoniously accepts it. On his way home Layevski discovers his wife's "dates" but being depressed and cowarded he ignores it.

When it is time to select assistants for a duel - Layevski employs 2 of his neighbors. Von Koren asks Samoylenko and his long term friend , Dyakon Podedov , a local priest , but both unwilling to see a possible fatal result and instead employ 2 of Samoylenko's colleagues. Once the duel starts it is revealed that no of the participants really know how the duel should be proceeded and try to refer to famous nobles where duels were described. Layevski agrees to cancel the duel and apologize to Von Koren but the later is determined to eliminate Layevski once and for all and refuses. Layevski then, shouts in the air. Von Koren sets a clear shot on Layevski but is disturbed in the last moment by the scream of Pobedov, who sneaked secretly and hided behind the trees nearby. The duel then ends, both parts pay their assistants for their service and return home.  Podedov, assuming Von Koren deliberately missed the shout is happy to join them but once realizing the final result of the duel unless his disturbance is disgusted and leaves alone.

Several time later, Von Koren is about to leave for his next expedition and is asked by Samoylenko and Podedov to visit Layevski before leaving. It is revealed that during this time Layevski has visibly changed. He has married Nadyezhda Fyodorovna and they both started working hard. Nadyezhda Fyodorovna now works all day in the farm they have created and Layevski writes poems all day in order to earn money and pay his debts he has gained over the years. Seeing this Von Koren admits that he is now wrong about him but claims that he still stands for his principles and after a brief and cold conversation - leaves. Von Koren rejects Podedov's compliments regarding both of them - claiming that Layevski has overcome his laziness and Von koren his ego. Von Koren claims that nothing has really changed. Layevski is still the same weak coward over-respecting everybody and Von Koren doesn't really believe he is able to change. Regarding himself, Von Koren is no longer considering himself as the "hard-working humanity savior" is sad from the situation. Von Koren then leaves into the ocean, watched by Layevski and Nadyezhda Fyodorovna walking along the coast.

Cast 
 Oleg Dahl - Layevski
 Vladimir Vysotsky - Von Koren
 Lyudmila Maksakova - Nadezhda Fyodorovna
 Anatoli Papanov - Dr. Samoylenko
  - Dyacon Pobedov
  - Kirilin
 Ashot Melikjanyan as Achmianov
 Lyubov Malinovskaya as Bityugova
 Yuriy Medvedev as Sheshkovsky
 Andrei Apsolon

Reward 
 1974 - The "Charybdis" prize for the best performance of the male role to Vladimir Vysotsky at the V festival of Nations in Taormina, Italy.

References

External links 

1973 drama films
1973 films
Soviet drama films
1970s Russian-language films